The Royal Order of Cambodia was a colonial order of chivalry of French Cambodia, and is still in use as an order of chivalry in the present-day Kingdom of Cambodia.

History

Colonialism
In 1845, the Rattanakosin Kingdom (in present-day Thailand) and Nguyễn dynasty (in present-day Vietnam) established a joint protectorate over the Kingdom of Cambodia. With French support, Cambodia gained independence under King Norodom in 1863, but he had to accept the French protectorate of Cambodia and a strong French interference in the administration of his country.

On 8 February 1864, the king founded the Royal Order of Cambodia as an order of merit with five degrees. After 1896, the French government and the kings of Cambodia each granted themselves the Order of Cambodia. The French president was rightly Grand Cross in the Royal Order of Cambodia. The order served to distinguish civilians and soldiers, subjects of the king or strangers, who had made themselves worthy. In 1896, the order was officially taken up in the French system of colonial orders of chivalry.

For French appointments, the recipient had to be at least 29 years old and enter the Order first as a knight, to be promoted to a higher grade after a certain period.  Only officers of the Légion d'honneur could become a commander in the Order and only commanders of the Légion d'honneur could be Commanders or Officers of the Order.  Apart from decorations for bravery or merit during foreign campaigns, the French colonial orders also required that a certain number of years had to have been spent in the tropics or overseas to be eligible - in this case, three years in Indochina, preferably in Cambodia.  From 1933 the Order was also granted for the organization of exhibitions dedicated to Cambodia and sacred events important to the French colonies.  None of these rules applied for grants by the King of Cambodia himself.

The colonial and overseas orders were immediately contingent on the French orders and awarded on ministerial orders.  Those awarded it not only had to pay for their own registration and qualifications, but also had to buy their own insignia.

Post-colonial
In 1948 France ceased granting the order. Formally it remained a French colonial policy, but it was now only granted by the King of Cambodia. The order has since then been one of the historical orders of France.

On September 1, 1950 the (colonial) French order-system was reformed. The Order of the Star of Anjouan and the Order of the Black Star were formalised as French Overseas Orders. The other three were the "Order of States Associated to the French Union" (French: "Ordre des États de l'Union Française Associés"). In 1955, Cambodia became independent. The order was approved by King Norodom Sihanouk during his government and also granted during his exile in Beijing.
The order became dormant in 1975, under the governemnt of Democratic Kampuchea. Following United Nations supported elections in 1993, H.M. King Norodom Sihanouk, was returned to the throne and the Order was reinstituted by Royal Decree No. 1095/01 dated 5 October 1995. This decree was signed by Chea Sim as the King's representative, Norodom Ranariddh, the First Prime Minister and Hun Sen, the Second Prime Minister at the time. A few design changes took place. After the restoration of the Khmer dynasty it remained the highest Cambodian distinction. The original French type crown has been replaced by the Khmer Royal Crown.

Grades

Since 1948
The five classes of appointment to the Order are, in descending order of precedence:
  Maha Sirivaddha (មហាសេរីវឌ្ឍន៍) or Knight Grand Cross
  Mahasena (មហាសេនា) or Knight Grand Officer (GOC)
  Dhipadinda (ធិបឌិន្ទ) or Knight Commander (KCC)
  Sena (សេនា) or Knight Officer (OC)
  Assarariddhi (អស្សឫទ្ធិ) or Knight or Chevalier (KC)

Prior to 1948
The five classes of appointment to the Order are, in descending order of precedence:
  Maha Sirivaddha (មហាសេរីវឌ្ឍន៍) or Knight Grand Cross (GCC)
  Mahasena (មហាសេនា) or Knight Grand Officer (GOC)
  Dhipadinda (ធិបឌិន្ទ) or Knight Commander (KCC)
  Sena (សេនា) or Knight Officer (OC)
  Assarariddhi (អស្សឫទ្ធិ) or Knight or Chevalier (KC)

Post-Nominals
The senior ranks of Knight Grand Cross entitle their members to use the title as post-nominal GCC; Knight Grand Officer, GOC; Knight Commander, KCC.
The lower ranks of Knight Officer use the post-nominal OC; and Knight, KC. Members of all classes of the order are assigned positions in the order of precedence. The highest level of the Knight Grand Cross relates to refinement. Those honored in this way are raised to the personal, non-hereditary status of nobility and henceforth bear the title His or Her Excellence (H.E.). This is prefixed to the full name.

Insignia
The medal of the order comes in many different forms, as a slightly elongated silver or gold star surmounted by a Cambodian crown and with an image of the king's crown and coat of arms in gold on a violet blue background and surrounded by a red circle.  The reverse of the medal is left rough.  To promote the order if it was awarded by the French, the Cambodian crown was replaced with a European one surmounted by a small cross, and in the early years the order was even awarded without any crown.

The central image on the star of the order is the same as the medal, though the crown is missing and the rays are usually smooth. The star is elongated, with the vertical rays longer than the horizontal rays. The regalia of Knights is in silver, whilst those of the higher grades are gold. The medal and star are equally for civilians and soldiers. The ribbon of the order was originally green with a red border, changing in 1899 to white with an orange border (in the same year the French government changed the colours of the ribbons of all five colonial orders), before reverting to the original black ribbon when it became a purely Cambodian order again.

Recipients

References

External links

 Les Compagnons de la Libération - Croix et Attributs ", de Cyrille CARDONA, édité par la SAMOL, 2022, ISBN : 978-2-9581971-0-0
 Indochina Medals, THE ORDERS AND MEDALS OF THE KINGDOM OF CAMBODIA
 Medals of the World, Kingdom of Cambodia: Royal Order of Moniseraphon

1905 establishments in French Indochina
Awards established in 1864
Colonial orders of chivalry
French protectorate of Cambodia
Knights Grand Cross of the Royal Order of Cambodia
Orders of chivalry of France
Orders, decorations, and medals of Cambodia